The term fusilier battalions  denotes 57 separate military formations which were raised in Belgium to fight alongside the Western Allies in the final months of World War II. Unlike the Free Belgian Forces which were raised in exile, the fusilier battalions were raised within Belgium after its Liberation from German occupation in September 1944. In total, 57 battalions (each numbered between 1-39 and 45-62) with a total of 53,700 men were raised between October 1944 and June 1945.

Origins and creation
The concept of the fusilier battalions originated in plans by the Belgian government in exile to rebuild the Belgian Army once its national territory was liberated from German occupation. In June 1943, they created a formal plan to raise 18 battalions of soldiers in Belgium once the territory was regained. The core of the new force would be six battalions of front-line infantry to augment the existing Independent Belgian Brigade, known popularly as the "Piron Brigade" which had originally been formed in exile, and six battalions of fusiliers, intended to serve in auxiliary roles such as guarding lines of communication. A further six logistics (pionniers) battalions would be created. This was approved by the Supreme Headquarters Allied Expeditionary Force (SHAEF) in May 1944. Supply constraints, however, meant that the original targets were subsequently revised to create 12 battalions of fusiliers and four of pioneers, making a total of 6,000 men. The creation of the new units began after the liberation of Belgium in September 1944. By December 1944, 12 battalions had been raised with surplus British equipment. After the failure of Operation Market Garden, however, the Allies decided to review the agreement.

In December 1944, the Allies signed an agreement on Liberated Manpower Units (LMU) that called for the raising of 77 battalions of fusiliers and eight auxiliary logistics battalions over two years. If completed, the agreement would have resulted in the mobilisation of 91,000 men. The fusilier battalions were each numbered between 1-39 and 45–62. In addition, the Belgian government had already begun a project of expanding the Piron Brigade into a new brigade of infantry, plus regiments of armour and artillery in a separate programme.

In all, 57 of the planned 77 fusilier battalions were created before the programme ended on VE Day. A further four battalions of pioneers were created, as well as 34 companies of road transport and smaller auxiliary units. In total, 53,700 men served in the units. Many of those recruited into the battalions had been members of the Belgian Resistance, with 80 percent having been members of the right-wing Secret Army and National Royalist Movement groups.

Although the majority were still in training at the end of the war, 20 battalions saw active service on the Western Front in the final months of the war. These included the 1st, 2nd and 3rd battalions which served in the Netherlands, the 4th Battalion which was at the Rhine, the 5th and 6th which fought during the Battle of the Bulge, the 12th which participated in the Battle of Remagen, and the 17th which finished the war at Plzeň in Czechoslovakia. From December 1944, the remaining fusilier battalions were formed into 16 "Fusilier Brigades".

References

External link
http://www.be4046.eu/BnFus.htm The Fuselier Battalions and Brigades 1944-1946

Bibliography

Military units and formations of Belgium in World War II
Military units and formations established in 1944
Military units and formations disestablished in 1945
1944 establishments in Belgium
1945 disestablishments in Belgium